Robert Hodges Johnson (born October 1, 1934) is an American prelate who served as the fifth Bishop of Western North Carolina in The Episcopal Church.

Biography
Johnson was born on  October 1, 1934, in Jacksonville, Florida, the son of William Weakley Johnson and Marjorie Philips. He served in the United States Army between 1957 and 1960. He earned a Bachelor of Science and a Bachelor of Arts from the University of Florida, a Master of Divinity the Virginia Theological Seminary, and a Doctor of Divinity from the University of the South and the Virginia Theological Seminary, respectively.

After ordination in 1963, he served at the Church of Our Saviour and St George's Church, both in Jacksonville, Florida. He also served at the church of St. Martin in the Highlands, in Jacksonville, before serving as a senior canon at St John's Cathedral. Prior to his election as bishop, he served as rector of the Church of the Holy Innocents in Atlanta, Georgia, a post he held for 17 years.

In November 1988, Johnson was elected Coadjutor Bishop of Western North Carolina. He was consecrated on March 11, 1989, in the Ashville Civic Center, and he succeeded as diocesan in 1990. He retired in 2004. Johnson served as Interim Bishop of Southern Virginia in 2006, and was named Assisting Bishop of Pittsburgh in 2008.

References

Living people
Episcopal Church in North Carolina
1934 births
Virginia Theological Seminary alumni
University of Florida alumni
People from Jacksonville, Florida
Episcopal bishops of Western North Carolina